The Armed Force Medical Services (AFMS) is an inter services organisation under the Ministry of Defense, covering the Indian Armed Forces. It came into existence in 1948. The Director General Armed Forces Medical Services (in the rank of Lt Gen or equivalent) is the head of the Armed Forces Medical Services and is responsible to the Government for the overall medical policy in so far as they relate to the Armed Forces.

History
In March 1947 a committee named “Armed Forces Medical Services and Research Integration Committee” headed by Dr BC Roy was appointed by the Government of India to consider the integration of the three medical services and medical research in the three services. The Committee recommended that there should be three branches of the Indian Armed Forces Medical Services i.e. Army, Navy and Air Force and that there should be a Supreme Controller of all the three Medical Services designated as Director General of the Armed Forces Medical Services (DGAFMS) who would be the advisor to the Supreme Commander or the Defence Minister as the case may be, regarding the medical needs of the Armed Forces. He will be the administrative head of the Armed Forces Medical Services.

Accordingly, the Government in 1948 integrated the medical services of the Royal Indian Navy, the Indian Army and the Royal Indian Air Force into the Armed Forces Medical Service and placed the services under the Director General Armed Forces Medical Services with the rank of Lieutenant General / Vice Admiral / Air Marshal. The Government also laid down the role and character of responsibilities of DGAFMS. The DGAFMS was made directly responsible to the Ministry of Defence for overall medical policy matters in so far as they relate to the Armed Forces. The Government further laid down that the heads of medical services of Army, Navy and Air Force will be responsible for functioning of these services under the respective Service Chiefs in accordance with any general policy directions that may be given by the DGAFMS. The charter has since been amended and updated from time to time.

Organization
The Director General Armed Forces Medical Services heads the entire AFMS. The Director Generals of Medical Services of Army, Navy and Air Force are 
responsible for overseeing the functioning of the hospitals of the respective Services and also are the medical advisors to their respective Chief of Staff.

The AFMS consists of Army Medical Corps (AMC) including AMC (NT), Army Dental Corps (AD Corps) and Military Nursing Service (MNS).

Classification of hospitals
Hospitals in the Army are classified into various categories as Sectional, Peripheral, Mid Zonal, Zonal, Command, Army Hospital (Research & Referral), based on bed strength and extent of availability of specialties.

Training institutions

The Armed Forces Medical College, Pune (AFMC) is the premier training institution of the AFMS established in May 1948. Other select hospitals such as AH (R&R), CH (AF) Bengaluru and INHS Ashwini Mumbai also impart post graduate training to the AMC officers. The College of Nursing at AFMC conducts a four-year degree course in Nursing.

See also

Army Medical Corps (India)
Military Nursing Service
Military Engineer Services (India)

References

External links
 - Ministry of Defence

Defence agencies of India